is a Japanese actress. She is known for her breakout role in the popular live-action film Let Me Eat Your Pancreas.

Biography
Minami started off her career by winning the New Generation Award at the 7th Toho Cinderella Audition. She has since starred in numerous films and dramas, with many of them being live-action themed.

Minami gained widespread fame for her role in Japan for her role in the live-action film Let Me Eat Your Pancreas, which tells the story of a terminally ill girl's relationship with her introvert male classmate who happens to find out about her illness by accident. The film was the 5th highest-grossing film in Japan in 2017. Minami was awarded the Newcomer Of The Year Award at the 41st Japan Academy Film Prize. The film itself was nominated for the Picture of the Year award at the same ceremony.

Despite her young age, Minami has starred in a couple of films that has grossed over 1 billion yen in Japan.

In 2019, Minami starred in the film The Great War of Archimedes. The film grossed over 1.9 billion yen in Japan is amongst the highest-grossing film of 2019 in Japan.

In 2020, Minami co-starred with Ryusei Yokohama and Yukino Kishii in the live-action adaptation of the manga Cursed in Love.
 
Minami also appeared in the film Murders At The House of Death in 2020. The film has grossed over 1 billion yen and is the 20th highest-grossing film in Japan for the year 2020.

In December 2020, Minami starred in the live-action film The Promised Neverland. The film has since grossed over 2.1 billion yen in Japan, making it amongst the highest-grossing film of 2021 in Japan.

Minami starred in the drama Dr. White in 2022. The drama is based on the novels Dr. White: Senrigan no Karute (published 2015 by Kadokawa) and Dr. White: Kami no Shindan (published 2019 by Kadokawa) by Shin Kibayashi.

Minami also appeared alongside Sho Hirano in the SP drama Seito ga Jinsei wo Yarinaoseru Gakko.

Minami again starred alongside Yukino Kishii in the film One Day, You Will Reach the Sea (Yagate Umi e to Todoku) which was released in April 2022. 

Minami has been chosen as the 108th Asadora heroine by NHK whereby she will star alongside Ryunosuke Kamiki. She was chosen directly by NHK without audition and will appear as the wife of the hero played by Kamiki. The Asadora is titled Ranman (らんまん). Filming will begin in fall 2023.

She is scheduled to star in the live-action Shin Kamen Rider film in 2023.

Personal life
Minami has a Pomeranian pet dog she affectionately calls "Popu-chan". She is close friends with fellow actors Takumi Kitamura and Kanna Hashimoto.

Filmography

Films

Television

Music videos

Awards

References

External links
 Official profile 
 
 
 

2000 births
Japanese child actresses
Japanese film actresses
Japanese television actresses
Actors from Ishikawa Prefecture
Living people
21st-century Japanese actresses
Horikoshi High School alumni